Roy Clark  is a former Metropolitan Police Deputy Assistant Commissioner and head of Scotland Yard's Anti-Corruption Squad.  Upon retiring from the Metropolitan Police, Clark became Director of Crimestoppers UK, then Director of Investigations at the Independent Police Complaints Commission.  He was the Director of Criminal Investigations for HM Revenue and Customs from its formation in 2005 until 2011.

Clark was appointed Commander of the Order of the British Empire (CBE) in the 2009 Birthday Honours.

Footnotes

Metropolitan Police chief officers
Commanders of the Order of the British Empire
English recipients of the Queen's Police Medal
Metropolitan Police recipients of the Queen's Police Medal
Civil servants in HM Revenue and Customs
Living people
Year of birth missing (living people)